Nothing Worth Having Comes Easy is the second album by Sheffield band Little Man Tate released on 15 September 2008. It was released as a standard CD and a special enhanced version with exclusive video footage.

Track listing
All songs written by Jon Windle and Edward 'Maz' Marriott.
"Money Wheel"
"What Your Boyfriend Said"
"She Looked Like Audrey Hepburn"
"Shot at Politics"
"Hey Little Sweetie"
"Joined by an iPod"
"Face on a Wall"
"A Little Heart"
"Time for Anything"
"Back of the Pub Quiz"
"London Skies London Eyes"
"Shoulder to Sigh On"
"The Last Hurrah" (Bonus track)

References

External links
 Little Man Tate official website
 Little Man Tate on MySpace

2008 albums
Little Man Tate (band) albums